Mairwa City Council is a Nagar Panchayat (City council) located in Siwan district of Bihar in India.

The city is divided into total 13 wards. It is the block headquarter of Mairwa block. It is famous for the historical temple of Baba Hari Ram Brahma.

See also
Siwan Subdivision

References

Cities and towns in Siwan district